BFL can stand for:

 Bat for Lashes, the stage name of musician Natasha Khan
 Big Fat Liar, 2002 comedy film
 Brothers for Life, a gang in the south-western suburbs of Sydney, Australia.
 Bluefaced Leicester, a breed of sheep
 Body for Life, a fitness program created by Bill Phillips
 BFL Group, an Emirati retail company

Aviation
 Meadows Field Airport in Bakersfield, California (IATA code: BFL)
 Buffalo Airways (ICAO code: BFL)

Sports
 Ballarat Football League
 Belgian Football League
 Bellarine Football League
 Bendigo Football League